The 2011 Ukrainian Super Cup became the eighth edition of Ukrainian Super Cup, which is an annual season opening football exhibition game contested by the winners of the previous season's Ukrainian Top League and Ukrainian Cup competitions.

The match was played on 5 July 2011 in Poltava at the Vorskla Stadium becoming second time when the game was played at the stadium.

This year the Super Cup was contested by league and cup winner Shakhtar Donetsk and cup runner-up Dynamo Kyiv. Dynamo won it 3–1.

Match

Details

2011
2011–12 in Ukrainian football
FC Shakhtar Donetsk matches
FC Dynamo Kyiv matches
Sport in Poltava